Thomas C. Smith (March 16, 1927 – May 25, 2014) was a member of both the Arizona State Senate and the Arizona House of Representatives. He served in the House from January 1993 until January 1999, and in the Senate from January 1999 through January 2003. He was first elected to the House in November 1992, representing District 26, and was re-elected in 1994 and 1996. In 1998 he ran for the State Senate from the same district, and won. He was re-elected in 2000. He did not run for re-election in 2002.

References

Republican Party Arizona state senators
Republican Party members of the Arizona House of Representatives
1927 births
2014 deaths